Kominimung is a poorly known probable Ramu language of Papua New Guinea.

References

Tamolan languages
Languages of Madang Province